Convenience sampling (also known as grab sampling, accidental sampling, or opportunity sampling) is a type of non-probability sampling that involves the sample being drawn from that part of the population that is close to hand. This type of sampling is most useful for pilot testing.

Definition 
A convenience sample is a type of non-probability sampling method where the sample is taken from a group of people easy to contact or to reach; for example, standing at a mall or a grocery store and asking people to answer questions. This type of sampling is also known as grab sampling or availability sampling. There are no other criteria to the sampling method except that people be available and willing to participate. In addition, this type of sampling method does not require that a simple random sample is generated since the only criterion is whether the participants agree to participate.

Applications 

Convenience sampling is not often recommended for research due to the possibility of sampling error and lack of representation of the population. But it can be handy depending on the situation. In some situations, convenience sampling is the only possible option. For example, a college student who is doing a term project and wants to know the average consumption of coke in that college town on Friday night will most probably call some of his friends and ask them how many cans of coke they drink, or go to a nearby party to do an easy survey. There is always a trade-off between this method of quick sampling and accuracy. Collected samples may not represent the population of interest and therefore be a source of bias.

In the example above, if said college town has a small population and mostly consists of students, and that particular student chooses a graduation party for survey, then his sample has a fair chance to represent the population. Larger sample size will reduce the chance of sampling error occurring.

Another example would be a gaming company that wants to know how one of its games is doing in the market one day after its release. Its analyst may choose to create an online survey on Facebook to rate that game. The major challenge of this approach will be reaching to the people who play games. As social media is a vast place, it's always difficult to collect samples from the population of interest. Most people may not be interested or take the survey seriously while completing it, which results in sampling error. The survey may be improved greatly if the analyst posts it to fan pages dedicated to game lovers. He may find a lot more people in that group who would be inclined to judge and rate the game critically.

Advantages 
Convenience sampling can be used by almost anyone and has been around for generations. One of the reasons that it is most often used is due to the numerous advantages it provides. This method is extremely speedy, easy, readily available, and cost-effective, causing it to be an attractive option to most researchers.

Expedited data collection

When time is of the essence, many researchers turn to convenience sampling for data collection, as they can swiftly gather data and begin their calculations. It is useful in time sensitive research because very little preparation is needed to use convenience sampling for data collection. It is also useful when researchers need to conduct pilot data collection in order to gain a quick understanding of certain trends or to develop hypotheses for future research. By rapidly gathering information, researchers and scientists can isolate growing trends, or extrapolate generalized information from local public opinion.

Ease of research

Researchers who are not looking for accurate sampling, can simply collect their information and move on to other aspects of their study. This type of sampling can be done by simply creating a questionnaire and distributing it to their targeted group. Through this method, researchers can easily finish collecting their data in a matter of hours, free from worrying about whether it is an accurate representation of the population. This allows for a great ease of research, letting researchers focus on analyzing the data rather than interviewing and carefully selecting participants.

Ready availability

Since most convenience sampling is collected with the populations on hand, the data is readily available for the researcher to collect. They do not typically have to travel great distances to collect the data, but simply pull from whatever environment is nearby. Having a sample group readily available is important for meeting quotas quickly, and allows for the researcher to even do multiple studies in an expeditious fashion.  

Cost effectiveness

One of the most important aspects of convenience sampling is its cost-effectiveness. This method allows for funds to be distributed to other aspects of the project. Oftentimes this method of sampling is used to gain funding for a larger, more thorough research project. In this instance, funds are not yet available for a more complete survey, so a quick selection of the population will be used to demonstrate a need for the completed project.

Disadvantages 
Even though convenience sampling can be easy to obtain, its disadvantages can outweigh this advantage. This sampling technique may be more appropriate for one type of study and less for another.
 
Bias

The results of the convenience sampling cannot be generalized to the target population because of the potential bias of the sampling technique due to the under-representation of subgroups in the sample in comparison to the population of interest. The bias of the sample cannot be measured. Therefore, inferences based on convenience sampling should be made only about the sample itself.

Power

Convenience sampling is characterized with insufficient power to identify differences of population subgroups.

References

Sampling techniques